Karanpur tehsil is one of the nine tehsils of Ganganagar district. It falls in the north-west of the district. Karanpur city is the headquarters of the tehsil. Its north-west border touches Bahawalnagar district of Pakistani Punjab. It is bordered in the east by Shriganganagar tehsil and Padampur tehsil, and in the south by Raisinghnagar tehsil.

Sri Ganganagar district
Tehsils of Rajasthan